The Gee Gee Bridge was a heritage-listed road bridge that carried Noorong Road across the Wakool River, connecting Cunninyeuk with Wetuppa in New South Wales, Australia. The bridge was designed by Harvey Dare and opened in 1929. Owned by the Murray River Council it was replaced by a concrete structure in May 2020 and demolished.

History
Timber truss road bridges have played a significant role in the expansion and improvement of the NSW road network. Prior to the bridges being built, river crossings were often dangerous in times of rain, which caused bulk freight movement to be prohibitively expensive for most agricultural and mining produce. Only the high priced wool clip of the time was able to carry the costs and inconvenience imposed by the generally inadequate river crossings that often existed prior to the trusses construction. Timber truss bridges were preferred by the Public Works Department from the mid 19th to the early 20th century because they were relatively cheap to construct, and used mostly local materials. The financially troubled governments of the day applied pressure to the Public Works Department to produce as much road and bridge work for as little cost as possible, using local materials. This condition effectively prohibited the use of iron and steel, as these, prior to the construction of the BHP steel works at Newcastle in the early 20th century, had to be imported from England.

Harvey Dare, the designer of Dare truss and other bridges, was a leading engineer in the Public Works Department, and a prominent figure in early 20th century NSW.

Timber truss bridges, and timber bridges generally were so common that NSW was known to travellers as the "timber bridge state".

The 1929 bridge was replaced under the Roads & Maritime Services Timber Truss Bridge Strategy. The old bridge was demolished as part of the replacement. Work commenced in September 2018 with the new bridge opened in May 2020. The original bridge was subsequently demolished.

Description
Gee Gee Bridge was a Dare-type timber Allan truss road bridge.

A timber post and rail guard rail extended the full length of the bridge. In the 1990s strengthening of the timber trestles took place.

References

New South Wales State Heritage Register
Murray River Council
Road bridges in New South Wales
Articles incorporating text from the New South Wales State Heritage Register
Bridges completed in 1929
Buildings and structures demolished in 2020
1929 establishments in Australia
2020 disestablishments in Australia
Truss bridges in Australia
Wooden bridges in Australia
Bridges in the Riverina